Kris Van Dijck (born 2 October 1963 in Turnhout) is a Belgian politician affiliated to the New Flemish Alliance (N-VA), member of the Flemish Parliament and mayor of Dessel.

He was elected as a member of the Flemish Parliament in 1995 and reelected ever since. He has been floor leader for N-VA between 2004 and 2007 and between 2009 and 2012. He was elected Speaker of the Flemish Parliament on 18 June 2019 but had to resign as Speaker due to the fact that he was caught drunk driving and because he was accused P-magazine which reported on 11 July 2019 that Mr Van Dijck connived to commit fraud together with a sex worker. Van Dijck denies the accusations of fraud.

He was first elected to the Municipal Council of Dessel in 1989 and has been mayor of the town between 1995 and 2000 and again since 2007. N-VA has an absolute majority in the Municipal Council since the 2006 elections, even increased after the 2012 elections.

He is a teacher by profession.

He was caught drunk driving in July 2019 after causing an accident involving a parked trailer. Subsequently he tried to downplay the seriousness of this infraction by saying “I haven’t committed any crime”.
 
He was fully intending on staying in office after this. However after accusations of fraud involving tax-money and prostitutes - claims he says are ungrounded - he decided to resign on 11 July. Three months later, the deontological committee of the Flemish Parliament decided that Van Dijck had not made a deontological mistake.

External links
 Personal blog
 Member of the Flemish Parliament

Notes

Living people
Members of the Flemish Parliament
New Flemish Alliance politicians
1963 births
People from Turnhout
21st-century Belgian politicians